The 2021–22 UCLA Bruins men's basketball team represented the University of California, Los Angeles during the 2021–22 NCAA Division I season. The Bruins were led by third-year head coach Mick Cronin and they played their home games at Pauley Pavilion as members of the Pac-12 Conference. All ten players from the previous year's Final Four team returned. Johnny Juzang earned third-team All-American honors, and he was named first-team all-conference along with Tyger Campbell and Jaime Jaquez Jr. Jaquez, Jaylen Clark and Myles Johnson were also voted to the Pac-12 All-Defensive team. New this season is that the team's footwear, apparel, and equipment are provided by Jordan Brand and Nike.

UCLA was ranked nationally in the top 10 for most of the season. They began the season 5–0 before facing Gonzaga in a rematch of the Final Four from the 2021 NCAA tournament. However, the No. 2 Bruins suffered their first defeat in an 83–63 blowout to the No. 1 Bulldogs. The UCLA team experienced a COVID-19 outbreak starting on December 15, 2021, causing them to cancel three nonconference games and postpone two Pac-12 games. The Bruins resumed play on January 6, 2022, against Long Beach State. At this time, the team began to play behind closed doors due to COVID-19 restrictions on indoor events implemented by the campus. The rematch against the Beach, who UCLA defeated earlier in November, was scheduled after the Bruins' original opponents that week, Arizona State and Stanford, needed to postpone due to coronavirus issues in their programs. It was the first time UCLA faced a nonconference opponent twice in the same regular season since 1982–83, when they faced Notre Dame in a home and away series.

The Bruins lost in overtime to Oregon on January 13, their first defeat since late November. UCLA then won six straight conference games, including their sixth consecutive over rival Arizona, to gain sole possession of first place in the Pac-12. However, the Bruins lost their third game in four contests after falling to their crosstown rivals, USC. It was their fifth straight loss to the Trojans, their longest drought in the series since the 1940s. UCLA ended the regular season winning six of their last seven games. They won their regular-season finale against USC to claim the No. 2 seed in the Pac-12 tournament, breaking their tie with the Trojans for second place in the conference. It was the Bruins' first win in the series since February 2019, and their first under Cronin. UCLA advanced to the Pac-12 Tournament championship game, where they lost to Arizona. It was the Bruins' first appearance in the title game since their win in 2014 over the Wildcats.

Seeded No. 4 in the East Regional of the NCAA tournament, UCLA rallied in the opener for a 57–53 comeback win over 13th-seeded Akron. Campbell scored eight of the Bruins' final 10 points, and he finished with a team-high 16. The Bruins defeated fifth-seeded Saint Mary's 72–56 to advance to the Sweet 16 in consecutive seasons for the first time since 2015. UCLA was eliminated in the semifinals in a 73–66 loss to eighth-seeded North Carolina. The Bruins led by three points with two minutes remaining in a game that featured 14 lead changes and eight ties.

On March 25, assistant coach Michael Lewis was named as head coach of Ball State basketball team.

Previous season

The Bruins are coming off of a season in which they made an improbable run in the NCAA tournament to the Final Four, where their upset bid against top-ranked Gonzaga in the National Semifinal fell just short in overtime, 93–90. UCLA, which had begun the tournament in the First Four, became just the fifth 11-seed to ever advance to the Final Four. They finished the season with a 22–10 overall record.

Offseason

Departures

Incoming transfers

2021 recruiting class

Preseason
 September 14, 2021 – Nan Wooden, daughter of former UCLA men's basketball Coach John Wooden and long time supporter of the basketball team, died.

Preseason rankings
 October 13, 2021 – The Bruins are picked as the No. 1 team in the Pac-12 media poll.

Preseason All-Americans
 Johnny Juzang and Jaime Jaquez Jr. are named to  the Athlon Sports' pre-season All-America list, first and third team respectively.

Preseason award watchlists
 Tyger Campbell named to the Bob Cousy Award's watch list (Top point guard)
 Johnny Juzang named to the Jerry West Award's watch list (Top shooting guard)
 Jaime Jaquez Jr. named to the Julius Erving Award's watch list (Top small forward)
 Myles Johnson named to the Kareem Abdul-Jabbar Award's watch list (Top center)
 Jaime Jaquez Jr. and Johnny Juzang are named to the NABC Player of the Year watch list
 Tyger Campbell, Jaime Jaquez Jr. and Johnny Juzang: John R. Wooden Award watch list

Roster

Schedule and results

|-
!colspan=12 style=| Exhibition

|-
!colspan=12 style=| Regular season

|-
!colspan=12 style=|  Pac-12 Tournament

|-
!colspan=12 style=|  NCAA Tournament

Rankings

*The preseason and week 1 polls were the same.^Coaches poll was not released for Week 2.

Statistics

Awards and honors

 December 7, 2021 – Jules Bernard and Myles Johnson were named as candidates for the men's basketball Senior CLASS Award
 January 5, 2022 – Jaime Jaquez and Johnny Juzang were named to the Wooden Award Midseason Top 25 watchlist.
 January 31, 2022 – Tyger Campbell selected to the Bob Cousy Award 10-person watch list
 January 31, 2022 – Johnny Juzang named to the John R. Wooden Award 20-person late season watch list
 February 1, 2022 – Johnny Juzang is named to the Jerry West Award 10-person watch list, honoring the nation's top shooting guard
 February 2, 2022 – Jaime Jaquez Jr. is listed on the Julius Erving Award 10-person watch list, presented to the nation's top small forward.
 March 15, 2022 – Johnny Juzang, Tyger Campbell, and Jaime Jaquez Jr. are named to the NABC All-District 19 teams
 Juzang was named a third-team All-American by the National Association of Basketball Coaches.

Notes

References

UCLA Bruins men's basketball seasons
UCLA
UCLA Bruins basketball, men
UCLA Bruins basketball, men
UCLA Bruins basketball, men
UCLA Bruins basketball, men
UCLA